Carnide is a freguesia (civil parish) and district of Lisbon, the capital of Portugal. Located in northern Lisbon, Carnide is north of São Domingos de Benfica and Benfica, east of Lumiar, and directly south of Lisbon's border with Odivelas. The population in 2011 was 19,218,

Landmarks
Colégio Militar
Igreja de Nossa Senhora da Luz
Colombo Centre

References

Parishes of Lisbon